The 2020 Open 13 Provence was a men's tennis tournament played on indoor hard courts. It was the 28th edition of the Open 13, and part of the ATP Tour 250 series of the 2020 ATP Tour. It took place at the Palais des Sports in Marseille, France, from 17 February through 23 February 2020.

Singles main-draw entrants

Seeds 

 Rankings are as of February 10, 2020.

Other entrants 
The following players received wildcards into the main draw:
  Grégoire Barrère
  Antoine Hoang
  Harold Mayot

The following player received entry into the singles main draw using a protected ranking:
  Vasek Pospisil

The following players received entry from the qualifying draw:
  Egor Gerasimov 
  Norbert Gombos 
  Ilya Ivashka
  Dennis Novak

The following player received entry as a lucky loser
  Emil Ruusuvuori

Withdrawals 
Before the tournament
  Pablo Carreño Busta → replaced by  Mikael Ymer
  Jérémy Chardy → replaced by  Pierre-Hugues Herbert
  Dan Evans → replaced by  Jannik Sinner
  Fabio Fognini → replaced by  Mikhail Kukushkin
  Filip Krajinović → replaced by  Emil Ruusuvuori
  João Sousa → replaced by  Stefano Travaglia
  Jo-Wilfried Tsonga → replaced by  Richard Gasquet

Doubles main-draw entrants

Seeds 

1 Rankings are as of February 10, 2020.

Other entrants 
The following pairs received wildcards into the main draw:
  Arthur Cazaux /  Harold Mayot
  Petros Tsitsipas /  Stefanos Tsitsipas

Finals

Singles 

  Stefanos Tsitsipas defeated  Félix Auger-Aliassime, 6–3, 6–4

Doubles 

  Nicolas Mahut /  Vasek Pospisil defeated  Wesley Koolhof /  Nikola Mektić, 6–3, 6–4

References

External links 
Official website

2020 ATP Tour
2020
2020 in French tennis
February 2020 sports events in France